It's a Mystery may refer to:

 It's a Mystery (album), a 1995 album by Bob Seger
 It's a Mystery (TV series), a 1996–2002 UK TV series
 "It's a Mystery" (song), a 1981 song by Toyah
 "It's a Mystery", a 2000 song by Stratovarius from the album Infinite

See also 
 It's a Mystery, Charlie Brown, a 1974 TV special, based on comic-strip Peanuts, that aired on CBS